Rotuman, also referred to as Rotunan, Rutuman or Fäeag Rotuạm (citation form: Faega Rotuma), is an Austronesian language spoken by the indigenous people of the South Pacific island group of Rotuma, an island with a Polynesian-influenced culture that was incorporated as a dependency into the Colony of Fiji in 1881. Classification of Rotuman is difficult because of the large number of loan words from Samoan and Tongan, as a result of much cultural exchange over the history of the Pacific. Linguist Andrew Pawley groups the language with the West Fijian languages in a West Fijian–Rotuman branch of the Central Pacific subgroup of Oceanic languages.

The Rotuman language has sparked much interest with linguists because the language uses metathesis to invert the ultimate vowel in a word with the immediately preceding consonant, resulting in a vowel system characterized by umlaut, vowel shortening or extending and diphthongization.

Unlike its Pacific neighbors, Rotuman is typically considered an AVO (agent–verb–object) language.

Phonology

Rotuman has no phonemic vowel length and is underlyingly a language of open syllables. Thus, only consonant + vowel syllables exist in the underlying syllable structure, although phonological processes provide for more variation. A minimal word constraint that disallows words of less than two moras also alters this underlying representation. That constraint applies before word compounding (including reduplication as well):  ('coral reef') +  ('deep sea') →  ('deep sea pool'). Vowels are also lengthened when both final and stressed.

Non-high vowels are raised when they are followed by a syllable with a high vowel.
  → 
  → 
  → 

An important aspect of Rotuman morphonology is what could be called the "incomplete" and "complete" phases although they have also been referred to as "long" and "short" forms, "primary" and "secondary" forms, "absolute" and "construct" cases, and "proper and original" and "altered or construct" forms. The complete phase applies to semantically-definite or specific terms.  Otherwise, in normal conversation (excluding song, poetry and chant), the incomplete phase applies to all but the last morpheme of a word and all but the last word of a phrase. That can lead to syllable-final consonants in the language, which has an underlying all-open syllable system.
  ('eyes') +  ('take off') →  →  ('minutely') 

The above table (C indicates any consonant) shows that metathesis and deletion are important parts of incomplete phase formation. The final vowel and the immediately-preceding consonant metathesize from V1CV2#, to V1V2C# where V1 is any underlying penultimate vowel, V2 is any underlying ultimate vowel, C is any consonant, and # is the word, phrase, or morpheme boundary.

After metathesis, "V2 is deleted if V1 is not further back than V2 and if V2 is not lower than V1" or if the two vowels are identical. Further processes of elision result in coalescence or spreading of features: back vowels are fronted before front vowels of equal or greater height ( and/or  affect  and just  affects ) before the latter are deleted.
  → 
  → 

In addition, the  →  rule takes effect again, now outside of the moraic foot, and can occur with a following  and both . Also,  becomes  after a syllable with a high vowel ( or ).

Word stress is associated with left-dominant bimoraic feet. The penultimate mora of nonderived words carries the stress.  Other than the nominalizing suffix  and the causative suffix , stress is assigned before additional morphemes are affixed and before incomplete phase morphonology.

Orthography
Upon missionary contact, various orthographies abounded on the island of Rotuma. The French Catholic missionaries devised an orthography based on their own alphabet, and the primarily-English Wesleyan Methodist preachers developed their own orthography to write in Rotuman. The prevalent one used today is one from the Australian Methodist Reverend C. M. Churchward, whose knowledge of linguistics devised the Tongan orthography as well. Here is the alphabet, as it appears in Churchward's seminal work, "Rotuman Grammar and Dictionary":
 a – 

ȧ or ä –  ~ 
ạ – 
 e – 
 f – 
 g – 
 h – 
 i – 
 j – 
 k – 
 l – 
 m – 
 n – 
 o – 
ö – 
 p – 
 s – 
 t – 
 u – 
ü – 
 v – 
  –  the glottal stop

For the variations to the vowels a, o and i, Churchward's dictionary treats these letters as if no variation between the species occurred within the base letter: the word päega, meaning seat, appears before pạri meaning banana, which, in turn, appears before pau, meaning very much.

In addition, there are instances of all original vowels above appearing with a macron, indicating
that they are longer, although vowel length is arguably a phonological process.

Because Churchward's alphabet was created before a sufficient analysis of Rotuman phonology, it is not purely phonemic. George Milner proposed a more phonemic spelling without diacritics, which incorporates the understanding of vowel allophony as having to do with metathesis (see above)

Samples
This is the Rotuman language version of the Lord's prayer, as found in the translation of the Bible published in 1975 (Matthew 6:9–13). It is written using the diacritics of Churchward's orthography:

Otomis Öfaat täe e lạgi,
Ou asa la äfȧk la mama,
Ou pureaga la leum, ou rere la sok,
fak ma e lạgi, la tapema e rän te.
Äe la naam se ạmisa, e terạnit e i,
ta etemis telaa la tạumar,
Ma äe la fạuạkia te ne otomis sara,
la fak ma ne ạmis tapema re vạhia se iris ne sar se ạmisag.
Ma äe se hoa ạmis se faksara; äe la sạiạkia ạmis e raksaa.
Ko pureaga, ma nenei, ma kolori, mou ma ke se äeag, se av se es gataag ne tore. Emen

References

Bibliography

External links

 Rotuma Website Rotuman Language Page
 Rotuma Website Bibliography of Rotuman Language Studies
 "Rotuman" Page on Metathesis Site of Ohio State University's Language Department
 Rotuman dictionary online (select simple or advanced browsing)
 605 index cards of plant and animal names, labeled 'Rotuma' archived with Kaipuleohone
 Audio recordings of Rotuman language archived with Kaipuleohone

Central Pacific languages
Languages of Fiji
Rotuma
Subject–verb–object languages
Vulnerable languages